The Lumber River, sometimes referred to as the Lumbee River, is a  river in south-central North Carolina in the flat Coastal Plain. European settlers first called the river Drowning Creek, which is the name of its headwater. The waterway known as the Lumber River extends downstream from the Scotland County-Hoke County border to the North Carolina-South Carolina border. Soon after crossing into South Carolina, the Lumber River flows into the Little Pee Dee River, which flows into the Pee Dee River, or Great Pee Dee River. Finally, the combined waters flow into Winyah Bay and the Atlantic Ocean.

In 1989, the river was designated as a "Natural and Scenic River" by the North Carolina General Assembly. In addition, it is the only blackwater river in North Carolina to be designated as a National Wild and Scenic River by the Department of the Interior.  In 2010, the Lumber River was voted one of North Carolina’s Ten Natural Wonders, the result of an on-line contest held by Land for Tomorrow, a coalition dedicated to supporting the preservation of North Carolina’s land and water resources.

History

Ancient indigenous peoples 
Evidence from archeological excavations along the Lumber River has shown that successive cultures of indigenous Native Americans inhabited this area for thousands of years. A number of archaeological sites have been excavated on high ground along the river. While many have been disturbed by the agricultural practices of the post-Columbian era, numerous artifacts and some fossils have been recovered.  These include a dugout canoe made by indigenous people and estimated to be over 1,025 years old. This ancient canoe is on display at the Native American Resource Center at the University of North Carolina at Pembroke.

Much of the archaeological work in the Lumber River region has been done in Robeson County.  A total of 429 archaeological sites have been recorded in this area.  The sites contain components from various archaeological periods: Paleo-Indian, Archaic Woodland, Mississippian and Historic (after European encounter).

Iroquoian, Siouan, and Carolina Algonquian-speaking peoples were among the historic tribes who lived in the coastal and inland region prior to European encounter. Archeologists have identified 47 sites of potential importance, 20 of which are eligible for inclusion in  the National Register of Historic Places.

Eighteenth century 

Early English surveyors named the river "Drowning Creek." In 1749, British colonial records identified the river as a branch of the Little Pee Dee River. In 1809, the North Carolina state legislature changed the name of the river to Lumber, most likely to symbolize the thriving lumber industry in the area, and its use of the river for transporting logs. They wanted a name more positive than Drowning Creek.

Nineteenth century 
In the late 18th and the 19th centuries, the lumbering and naval stores industries were critical to the region's economy. The Lumber River became a vital route for transporting 100-foot logs downriver to the seaport of Georgetown, South Carolina. Lumberton, North Carolina was important for the timber industry and associated production of turpentine. The visible remaining bridge abutments, tram bridges, and dock pilings are reminders of the critical importance of lumbering and naval stores industries to the area as a whole.

Recreation 
In the 21st century, the Lumber River is a highly prized recreation corridor in North Carolina. Active outdoor recreation and festivals are among the most popular activities, including canoeing, boating, fishing, hunting, picnicking, camping, nature study, swimming, biking, jogging, crafts, and fossil and artifact hunting.

Lumber River State Park 
The Lumber and some of its adjoining banks are part of the Lumber River State Park, which comprises 9,874 acres of land and 115 miles of waterway. The park’s recreational activities are currently at Princess Ann Access in the south and the Chalk Banks access to the north (near the town of Wagram).

There are 24 boat launches along the Lumber River that serve as access points to Lumber River State Park. The entire length of the river is open to fishing. The common game fish are black crappie, largemouth bass, catfish and redbreast sunfish. All anglers must have a valid fishing license and follow the regulations of the North Carolina Wildlife Resources Commission. Nine primitive camping sites are located at the Princess Ann section of the park, between Orrum and Fair Bluff. These campsites are meant to be used by no more than 6 people at a time. Each camp site features, a picnic table and grill, lantern holder, trash can, and fire ring. There are several hiking trails and picnic areas at Princess Ann as well as the many municipal and county parks that are located on the Lumber River.

Fourteen individual campsites are available at the Chalk Banks Access Area in Scotland County for family camping. Each site has a table, lantern holder, trash can and fire pit. Canoe-in campsites are also available.

Local wildlife 
The Lumber River has many different types of organisms in and around it, including the Semotilus lumbee, which is a species endemic to the sandhills region that the Lumber River flows through. The Semotilus lumbee is also known as the sandhills chub. The cape fear chub is not the only unique organism that is found around the Lumber River. Other organism such as Megathymus yuccae, a giant yucca skipper and, Leuconotopicus borealis, the red-cockaded wood pecker are species that are endemic to habitats around the Lumbee River.

See also 
Lumber River State Park

References 

Locklear, Lawrence T. “Down by the Ol’ Lumbee: An Investigation into the Origin and Use of the Word ‘Lumbee’ Prior to 1952”, Native South 3 (2010): 103-117.
Knick, Stanley G. 1988  Robeson Trails Archaeological Survey: Reconnaissance in Robeson County; Native American Resource Center Publications; UNC Pembroke.
Knick, Stanley G.  1993  Robeson Crossroads Archaeological Survey: Intensive Testing; Native American Resource Center Publications; UNC Pembroke.
Knick, Stanley G.  2008 "Because It Is Right", Native South 1 (2008): 80-89. <http://muse.jhu.edu/journals/native_south/v001/1.knick.html>.

External links
Scotland County Travel & Tourism

Rivers of North Carolina
Rivers of South Carolina
Protected areas of Scotland County, North Carolina
Protected areas of Hoke County, North Carolina
Protected areas of Robeson County, North Carolina
Protected areas established in 1989
Tributaries of the Pee Dee River
Rivers of Scotland County, North Carolina
Rivers of Hoke County, North Carolina
Rivers of Robeson County, North Carolina
Wild and Scenic Rivers of the United States